International Automobile Company was a veteran era American automobile company.

History 
Founded in Charleston, West Virginia, in autumn 1899 with a capitalization of US$500,000, International's officers were H. A. La Paugh, Rebecca La Paugh, R. H. Hepner, D. B. Luckey, and J. Story, all from New York. Like many early American automobile companies, it is doubtful International actually built any cars.

Sources
Kimes, Beverly Rae. The Standard Catalog of American Cars, 1805-1942. Iola, Wisconsin: Krause Publications, 1989. .
1890s cars
Defunct motor vehicle manufacturers of the United States
History of West Virginia
Charleston, West Virginia
Defunct manufacturing companies based in West Virginia
1899 establishments in West Virginia
Vehicle manufacturing companies established in 1899
American companies established in 1899

Veteran vehicles